Closer Productions is a film and television production company founded by filmmakers Sophie Hyde and Bryan Mason in Adelaide, South Australia, in January 2004. It is known for award-winning feature films such as 52 Tuesdays (2013) and Animals (2019), as well as television series and documentary films.

History
Closer Productions was founded by Hyde and Mason, who are personal as well as professional partners, who began Closer Productions in 2004 and produced their first work under the Closer banner in 2005. Writer Matthew Cormack joined the pair soon afterwards, and Matthew Bate came in 2010. Previously, Bate had his own company, Plexus Films, but after working on separate projects after winning FilmLab funding, with Bate having his short film The Mystery of Flying Kicks, he and the Closer team decided to amalgamate. Closer Productions was registered as a private company on 28 January 2010. Producer Rebecca Summerton joined the company shortly after the merger.

Description
The company is located in the inner Adelaide suburb of Glenside, sharing the historic former administration building of Glenside Hospital with Adelaide Studios, which are managed by the South Australian Film Corporation (SAFC).

The company is self-described as a "collective of film-makers". , in addition to the four directors, Hyde, Mason (editor, DOP, producer, director), Cormack (writer, sales/delivery), Summerton (producer), and Bate (writer, director), other members of the team include editor, designer, and visual effects creator Raynor Pettge, emerging director and screenwriter Matt Vesely, and director Maya Newell (Gayby Baby, In My Blood It Runs).

Closer Services creates promotional films for industry clients and projects documenting various aspects of arts and architecture, including for clients such as the Adelaide Festival and the Art Gallery of South Australia (AGSA). They created a series of videos for the 2020 Tarnanthi exhibition at AGSA, which included profiles of Ernabella Arts, Iwantja Arts and Tjala Arts.

Grants and mentoring
In September 2020, Closer Productions and the Adelaide Film Festival announced a "new grants program aiming to broaden accessibility to the Australian filmmaking industry for artists from underrepresented communities". Four selected emerging filmmakers would be awarded  as well as the opportunity to participate in three workshops with the Closer Productions team.

Selected filmography

Feature fiction
52 Tuesdays (2013)
 Animals (2019)

Television series
Hannah Gadsby's Oz (2014), a 3-part series directed by Bate and featuring comedian and writer Hannah Gadsby
 Fucking Adelaide (2017) comedy drama, for ABC TV. AKA F*!#ing Adelaide and F**king Adelaide.
 The Hunting (2019)
 Aftertaste (2021), created by Matthew Bate and Julie De Fina, directed by Jonathan Brough

Short films and documentaries
Beyond Beliefs: Muslims & Non-Muslims in Australia (2007)
 Shut Up Little Man! An Audio Misadventure (2011), documentary/comedy/drama, written and directed by Matthew Bate
 Life in Movement (2011), a documentary about choreographer Tanja Liedtke
Sam Klemke's Time Machine (2015), feature-length documentary, written and directed by Matthew Bate
 My Best Friend is Stuck on the Ceiling (2015), s short comic film written and directed by Matt Vesely.
A Field Guide to Being a 12-Year-Old Girl (2017), written and directed by, and starring Tilda Cobham-Hervey
 In My Blood It Runs  (2019), feature-length documentary, directed by Maya Newell and others

Awards
Life in Movement won the best work award at the 2011 Ruby Awards, the 2011 Foxtel Australian Documentary Prize and AACTA nominations for direction and for best feature documentary. It was also nominated for the AACTA Best Feature Length Documentary and Best Direction in a Documentary, and the Australian Film Critics Association Awards Best Documentary.
52 Tuesdays – 10 wins and 20 nominations
Fucking Adelaide (2017) – Screen Producers Australia (SPA) Awards 2018: Winner, Online Series Production of the Year APDG Award for Costume Design for a Web Series 2018: Nominee (Renate Henschke); Adobe Award for Production Design for a Web Series 2018: Nominee (Amy Baker)

References

Further reading
 Interview with Rebecca Summerton, Bryan Mason, Sophie Hyde and Matthew Bate.

External links

Film production companies of Australia
Australian companies established in 2004
Companies based in Adelaide